Phagnalon saxatile is a plant that can grow up to  high.

References

Gnaphalieae